Paladin (often going by Paul Denning) is a fictional character, a mercenary appearing in American comic books published by Marvel Comics. Though not a supervillain, his mercenary activities often bring him into conflict with superheroes.

Publication history

The character was inspired by the 1950s Western television series Have Gun – Will Travel, in which the title character, Paladin, an investigator/gunfighter, travels around the Old West working as a mercenary for people who hire him to solve their problems.

Paladin first appeared in Daredevil #150 (January 1978), with follow-up appearances in #152 (May 1978) and #154 (September 1978) as part of the same story arc. The character had a one-shot story published in Marvel Premiere #43 (August 1978), and was a billed guest star in the Spider-Man team-up title Marvel Team-Up #108 (August 1981).

From there on, Paladin has mostly appeared as a guest star across the Marvel Universe, with occasional forays as a superteam member, in Silver Sable and the Wild Pack, Heroes for Hire and Thunderbolts, and occasional feature appearances in the Marvel Comics Presents anthology.

Fictional character biography
Paladin is a mercenary and private investigator, whose past is largely unrevealed. When first seen, he sought Daredevil while engaged in an assignment to track down the Purple Man, and battled Daredevil. He clashed with Daredevil a second time after the crime fighter inadvertently interfered with Paladin's search for the Purple Man. Paladin allied with Daredevil in battle against the Cobra, the Jester, and Mister Hyde, who were under control of the Purple Man.

Paladin next battled the Ghost. Paladin aided the Wasp against Baron Brimstone, acquired a modified uniform, and began a romance with the Wasp. Paladin aided the Avengers in battle against the Masters of Evil. Paladin allied with Spider-Man and the Wasp against mobsters; despite respecting Spider-Man's abilities, Paladin is incredulous that Spider-Man offers his heroic services without charge (Paladin literally laughs in Spider-Man's face upon learning this), while Spider-Man in turn is disgusted by Paladin's mercenary ways. Paladin also considers Spider-Man's incessant battle banter "unprofessional".

Paladin was later employed by Silver Sable to investigate a conspiracy which threatened her native country of Symkaria, and he allied with Spider-Man. Paladin was then hired by Diamondback to raid Serpent Society headquarters. He was captured, but freed by Captain America. Paladin accompanied Captain America in his search for Diamondback, the Asp, and Black Mamba. With his new allies, Paladin battled Superia's horde of female superhumans.

An unabashed womanizer, Paladin often flirted with whoever woman caught his eye. He briefly dated the Wasp at a time when she was separated from Hank Pym, much to the Black Knight's jealousy, who was also attracted to her. For a time, he also enlisted Generation X into helping him retrieve a sword for Adrienne Frost, the sister of current X-Men member Emma Frost. During this period, the mutant known as Jubilee was strongly attracted to Paladin, but that affection disappeared when Generation X and Paladin later went their separate ways. He has also been a longtime ally to Silver Sable and her Wild Pack organization, working for pay, of course. He once helped them protect a scientist from a kidnapping attempt by the Heroes for Hire, a group he would later join. His main opponent was Misty Knight, who seemed to be an equal match.

Paladin had exhibited a certain amount of honor in some cases. For example, he was once hired by a corrupt government to assist rebels as part of a sting operation. He aided the rebels in a bomb-laying operation at a government facility. When the rebels were caught, his government handler remarked how lucky they were that the bomb had not gone off. Paladin replied, "I'm sorry, that would have been extra," and activated the bomb by remote control while driving away.

In the 1990 one-shot The Punisher: No Escape, he was offered 10 million dollars by mobster Vincent Mangano to kill the Punisher. Paladin agreed to this arrangement, but did not succeed, and in the ensuing fight both of his legs were broken by the U.S. Agent.

Paladin once took down Daredevil with a sniper rifle from a helicopter at a great distance. He did so for the FBI, in exchange for getting his record expunged. The hit, while serious, was not fatal; Paladin's sniper attack led to Daredevil's arrest.

Paladin was a main character in the 2006 Heroes for Hire series, although as Misty Knight said he was just there for the money. As it turns out, he was a traitor to the group, only using the Heroes as a means to hunt down Captain America for S.H.I.E.L.D. as part of the Civil War.

He single-handedly defeated Captain America and the entire Heroes for Hire team, with the exceptions of Tarantula, and Orka, who weren't present when the fight took place, with a special gas weapon that affected the nervous system. He then radioed S.H.I.E.L.D. and told them he had Captain America in custody. However, he did not account for Shang-Chi's ability to hold his breath over an extended period (thanks to his martial arts training) and was overpowered by him. Shang-Chi then aided Captain America, who afterwards switched his costume with Paladin, causing S.H.I.E.L.D. to take Paladin instead into custody.

In the Dark Reign storyline, Paladin became a member of the post-Secret Invasion Thunderbolts, serving as Norman Osborn's personal black ops team. Hired to assassinate Elektra for 82 million dollars, Paladin broke into H.A.M.M.E.R. headquarters. However, Elektra overpowered him by choking him with one of her teeth that was loosened when Paladin punched her. Begging for his life, Paladin gave Elektra the key to escape her prison.

During the Siege of Asgard, Paladin and the other Thunderbolts were sent to Asgard with the mission of stealing the Spear of Odin for Osborn. After fighting through a contingent of Asgardians, they managed to find the Spear of Odin. Paladin, finally having had enough of serving a madman like Osborn, turned on his teammates and tried to take back the object. After being attacked by fellow Thunderbolt Grizzly, Paladin was saved by Ant-Man. Grizzly then lost the Spear of Odin to Mr. X who in turn was easily defeated by Quicksilver. Ant-Man recovered the Spear of Odin and gave it to Paladin who decided to take the object in order to keep Osborn from using its power for his own ends. Paladin then departed from Asgard after saying goodbye to Ant-Man.

During the Shadowland storyline, Paladin is paired with Silver Sable, Misty Knight, and Shroud when Daredevil's Hand ninjas end up targeting members of the mafia. Following this, Misty Knight reopens Heroes for Hire under the influence of Puppet Master; Paladin joins the team and soon realizes this and frees Misty from Puppet Master's control with the help from Iron Fist. After the defeat of Puppet Master, Paladin convinces Misty to keep the operation open, but under their terms.

Powers and abilities
Paladin's physical strength, speed, stamina, agility, reflexes, and durability are all slightly superhuman.  He is also a highly skilled hand-to-hand combatant, with knowledge of Boxing, Judo, Savate, and Taekwondo. In addition, Paladin is a skilled marksman, actor, espionage agent, bodyguard and detective.

While he has been written using lethal force, his preferred weapon is his stun gun, which fires a beam which scrambles the signals within the target's nervous system sufficiently to render most people unconscious. The range and effectiveness are unknown. The gun is equipped so that only Paladin may operate it.

Paladin wears a body-suit of synthetic stretch fabric, and his boots, gloves, helmet, torso, and knee and elbow guards are made of bulletproof composite materials. Paladin's helmet is equipped with a belt activated faceplate which slides down to make the helmet airtight, and has its own one-hour air supply. The lenses in Paladin's helmet can be adjusted for infrared vision.

Other versions

Ultimate Marvel
The Ultimate Marvel version of Marc Spector used the Paladin name for a period of time while working for the Roxxon Corporation.

In other media

Television
Paladin appears in the 2017 Spider-Man series, voiced by Trevor Devall. He is a member of the Wild Pack. In the episode "Take Two", Paladin pretends to steal from Oscorp so that he can fight Spider-Man for Silver Sable to study his moves. Though he is webbed up, Paladin later frees himself and joins the Wild Pack into stealing the Neuro Cortex from Horizon High. During Spider-Man and Doctor Octopus' fight with the Wild Pack, Spider-Man tricks Paladin and Battlestar into taking each other out with their weapons. When the Wild Pack is placed in prison, Paladin asks Sable if this was part of the plan, to which she states that their anonymous client (later revealed to be Doctor Octopus) has plans for the Neuro Cortex.

Video games
 Paladin appears in Marvel: Avengers Alliance 2.

Motion comics
 Paladin appears in the Spider-Woman motion comics, voiced by David J. Murphy.

References

External links
 Paladin at Marvel.com

Characters created by Carmine Infantino
Characters created by Jim Shooter
Comics characters introduced in 1978
Fictional actors
Fictional marksmen and snipers
Fictional mercenaries in comics
Fictional private investigators
Marvel Comics characters who can move at superhuman speeds
Marvel Comics characters with superhuman strength
Marvel Comics martial artists
Marvel Comics superheroes